Anavil Brahmins are a community of Brahmins who, despite not being numerically superior, are particularly dominant in the Surat and Bulsar districts of south Gujarat, India, where they have been significant land-owners and have an influential role in politics.

The Anavil are among the lay Brahmins communities who are not allowed to perform a priestly function. They comprise two sub-groups, called the Desai and the Bhathela, though both use the surname Desai. The former acted as tax farmers during the era of the Mughal Empire, and developed into one of the dominant land-owning groups in South Gujarat. They eventually underwent a process of sanskritisation that saw them conform more closely to the classical Brahmin practices, such as dowry marriage, while the Bhathela continued to follow the brideprice system for marriage. The Desai are fewer in number but superior in traditional status. 

According to Shah, most other Brahmins in the region do not consider the Anavils to be Brahmins because they are neither priests nor connected to Sanskritic learning. 

They did not practice female infanticide.

References

Further reading

Brahmin communities of Gujarat